Sanxiantai (Amis: nuwalian) is an area containing a beach and several islands located on the coast of Chenggong Township, Taitung County, Taiwan. The beach stretches for ten kilometers in length. It is situated at the 112-kilometer mark.  A popular tourist attraction for its rocky coastal views, the area is well known for its long footbridge in the shape of a sea dragon that connects the coast to the largest island.

Overview
Sanxiantai means "Platform of the three immortals". Sanxiantai Island has three extremely large rocks on the island. Sanxiantai Island has a unique shape. The area is best known for its long footbridge that connects the eastern coast of the main Island of Taiwan with the outer Island of Sanxiantai.

See also
 List of islands of Taiwan

References

Beaches of Taiwan
Landforms of Taitung County
Tourist attractions in Taitung County